Paulo Roberto de Souza Miklos (known as Paulo Miklos , born on January 21, 1959) is a Brazilian multi-instrumentalist, musician and actor. He is best known for his tenure with the band Titãs, in which he was a vocalist, guitarist and occasional saxophonist, keyboardist and harmonica player from its inception in 1982 until 2016, when he left it to focus on personal projects.

As an actor, he has appeared in a few films and television series. His acting career started with a main role in the movie O Invasor.

Childhood 
During his childhood, he learned to play the piano, the sax and the transverse flute. When he turned 12, he was given his first acoustic guitar, and decided to become a musician. He made it to play almost every instrument he could put his hands on, being influenced by The Beatles, Led Zeppelin, Deep Purple and the Tropicália movement.

Early works 
At high school, he started to create his own songs with his classmate Arnaldo Antunes. This partnership would later become Titãs. His professional debut happened on a TV Tupi music festival, in 1979, when he made an arrangement for a reggae song by Chico Evangelista. From small solo shows at bars to performances with bands like Bom Quixote, Sossega Leão and Banda Performática, he established his name in the local musical scene. Some well-known names in São Paulo, like Arrigo Barnabé, asked him to play with them.

After concluding high school at the Equipe school, he entered Philosophy at Pontifícia Universidade Católica de São Paulo and Psychology at Mogi Mirim. But after a few classes, he quit. So he entered the Music course of Escola de Comunicações e Artes (ECA) (Art and Communication School) of University of São Paulo, but as the course was strongly focused on classical music, he quit it too.

Titãs and rise to fame 

In 1981, he, Arnaldo and some other friends founded Titãs, which made Paulo raise to fame. Since its beginning, Paulo has been playing different instruments: sax, bass, guitar, keyboards, harmonica, etc.

In 1994, he released his self-titled first solo album, filled with songs written and composed by him. Until August 1997, it had already sold 7,800 copies. In 2001, he released the second one, called Vou Ser Feliz E Já Volto (I'm going to be happy, I'll be right back), produced by Dudu Marote.

In 2002, he made his debut at the cinema, playing the role of the murder Anísio, in the movie O Invasor, directed by Beto Brant. He earned five awards for the role: Surprise actor of the year and best original score at the Festival de Cinema de Brasília (Brasília Cinema Festival) and best supporting actor at the Cinema Brazil Grand Prize and Miami Brazilian Film Festival, best music at the Miami Brazilian Film Festival.

In 2014, he and Pato Fu vocalist Fernanda Takai performed the song "Mostra Tua Força Brasil" (Show Your Strength, Brazil), composed by Jair Oliveira and directed by Simoninha; it was a campaign by Itaú Unibanco for the 2014 FIFA World Cup in Brazil. This was not his only work linked to the World Cup: On June 10, he, along with journalist Eduardo Bueno; actress Maitê Proença, and writer Xico Sá debuted the TV show Extra Ordinários ("Extra Ordinary"), a SporTV humorous program in which the four, along with some guest stars, comment the World Cup and related themes.

Post-Titãs works 
In 2016, he announced he would leave the band to focus on his personal projects on music and acting. By then he had already commenced working on his third studio album, still untitled, which is in production stages. By that time, he promised to follow new ways as a composer, interpreter and actor.

In June 2017, he announced his album would be produced by Pupillo (Nação Zumbi), musically directed by journalist and researcher Marcus Preto and would feature many collaborations, including with Emicida, Dadi Carvalho, Erasmo Carlos in "País Elétrico", Guilherme Arantes in "Estou Pronto" and Russo Passapusso (BaianaSystem) in "Vigia". His former Titãs colleagues Arnaldo Antunes and Nando Reis were also invited, but their participations are yet to be confirmed.

In July 2017, the album title (A Gente Mora no Agora) and release date (August 2017) were announced, with the release show taking place on August 17 in São Paulo. The first single, "A Lei Desse Troço", was also released on July 7. It's a collaboration with Emicida with arrangements by Letieres Leite. Still in July, on the 28th, he released the song "Vou te Encontrar", written by Nando Reis, another former Titãs member.

Personal life 
Paulo Miklos lives in São Paulo with his daughter Manoela. His wife was Rachel Salém, who died on July 23, 2013, of lung cancer.

Discography

With Titãs

Solo works 
 Paulo Miklos – 1994
 Vou Ser Feliz e Já Volto – 2001
 A Gente Mora no Agora – 2017

Other albums 
 Mundo Pop – 2004
 Mundo Rock – 2004
 O Invasor – 2001
 Bang Bang Nacional, with the song "Os Dois No Ar" – 2006

Guest appearances

Filmography

Film

Television

References 

 Miklos' page at Titãs official web site

External links
Official website 

1959 births
Living people
20th-century Brazilian male singers
20th-century Brazilian singers
Brazilian bass guitarists
Male bass guitarists
Rock saxophonists
Rhythm guitarists
Rock harmonica players
Brazilian keyboardists
Brazilian songwriters
Brazilian composers
Brazilian male actors
Brazilian people of Hungarian descent
Brazilian multi-instrumentalists
Musicians from São Paulo
Titãs members
Brazilian harmonica players
Brazilian rock musicians
Brazilian mandolinists
Brazilian banjoists
Brazilian saxophonists
Male saxophonists
Pontifical Catholic University of São Paulo alumni
University of São Paulo alumni
21st-century saxophonists
21st-century Brazilian male singers
21st-century Brazilian singers